It's a Bear is a 1924 American short silent comedy film directed by Robert F. McGowan. It was the 28th Our Gang short subject released. It's a Bear was remade with sound in 1930 as Bear Shooters. Allen Hoskins appeared in both films.

Plot
The gang decides to go hunting for big game and encounter a real bear.

Cast

The Gang
 Joe Cobb as Joe
 Jackie Condon as Jackie
 Mickey Daniels as Mickey
 Allen Hoskins as Farina
 Mary Kornman as Mary
 Ernie Morrison as Ernie
 Dick Henchen as Dick
 Dinah the Mule
 Pal the Dog

Additional cast
 Helen Gilmore as Farmer's wife
 Noah Young as Sheriff

References

External links

1924 films
1924 short films
American silent short films
American black-and-white films
1924 comedy films
Films directed by Robert F. McGowan
Hal Roach Studios short films
Our Gang films
Silent American comedy films
1920s American films
1920s English-language films